The Vegas Golden Knights are an American professional ice hockey team based in the Las Vegas metropolitan area. They play in the Pacific Division of the Western Conference in the National Hockey League (NHL). They have played at T-Mobile Arena since their inaugural season in 2017–18. The Golden Knights joined the NHL as an expansion team in 2017. The team's first head coach, Gerard Gallant, was hired on April 13, 2017. Gallant was fired on January 15, 2020, and replaced by recently fired San Jose Sharks head coach Peter DeBoer. DeBoer served as head coach until his firing on May 16, 2022. Former Boston Bruins head coach Bruce Cassidy was named the team’s third head coach on June 14, 2022.

Key

Coaches
Note: Statistics are updated through the 2021–22 season.

Notes

References

Vegas Golden Knights head coaches
Vegas Golden Knights personnel
head coaches